Georgia joined the Iraq war as part of the United States-led coalition in August 2003. By 2008, Georgia had deployed 2,300 troops in Iraq, becoming the third largest contributor to the coalition forces in the Iraq War. In addition, the country provided a battalion of approximately 550 troops to the United Nations Assistance Mission in Iraq. All Georgian troops were withdrawn from Iraq amid the Russia–Georgia war in August 2008. Georgia suffered five fatal casualties in Iraq.

Deployment history  
Georgia strongly supported the U.S.-led entrance of troops in Iraq for peacekeeping purposes and deployed troops to the country in August 2003. Georgia's military deployment was undertaken as part of broader efforts to bolster closer ties with the United States and NATO. The United States provided military training programs—GTEP and GSSOP—for Georgian forces as part of the Global War on Terror. There was no tangible domestic opposition to the Georgian involvement in Iraq.  

Georgia's initial deployment was a platoon of special forces and a medical team, a total of 70 personnel in 2003. The Georgian presence in Iraq increased to 300 personnel in 2004 and to 850 in 2005, and peaked at 2,300 soldiers in mid-2008. The largest contingents deployed were the 3rd Infantry Brigade (July 2007 – January 2008) and the 1st Infantry Brigade (January–August 2008). In addition to participation in Operation Iraqi Freedom, from 2005 to 2008 Georgia also contributed a battalion of approximately 550 troops to the United Nations Assistance Mission in Iraq, which was stationed in Baghdad within the "Green Zone". 

At first, the Georgian troops deployed for Operation Iraqi Freedom were stationed in Baghdad and provided general security measures. Beginning in 2007, the Georgians were deployed along the border with Iran, with their main base at Kut, and tasked to interdict smuggled weapons, goods, and drugs. The Georgian units worked primarily within the U.S. area of operations. In total, more than 6,000 Georgian soldiers served in Iraq on the basis of six-month rotations; the service in Iraq was voluntary.

During the Russia–Georgia war in August 2008, Georgia recalled all of its forces from Iraq. The U.S. Air Force provided logistical support for the withdrawal. On August 10–11, 2008, 16 C-17 Globemasters shuttled around 2,000 Georgian soldiers and supplies back to Georgia, drawing a sharp protest from Russia.

Casualties  
In total, Georgia suffered three combat fatalities (all in 2008) and at least 19 servicemen were injured in Iraq. In addition, one Georgian serviceman died in a car accident and one committed suicide, both in 2007.

See also 
 Role of Georgia in the War in Afghanistan (2001–14)
 Georgian Kosovo contingent

References 

Georgia
Iraq
Iraq
Iraq
Iraq
Iraq
Iraq
Iraq
Iraq
Iraq